The 1992–93 season was Colchester United's 51st season in their history and their first season back in the Football League. Colchester competed in the Third Division, the fourth tier of English football, after achieving promotion from the Conference the season prior. Alongside competing in the Third Division, the club also participated in the FA Cup, the League Cup, the Football League Trophy, and the Conference Shield.

Roy McDonough led his newly promoted side to a tenth-placed finish in Division Three, finishing just four points off the play-off places. The club performed poorly in the cup competitions, instead focusing on league form. They exited the League Cup and Football League Trophy at the first round stages, and the FA Cup in the second round. They also faced Wycombe Wanderers in the Conference Shield, an annual tie between the Conference winners and the FA Trophy winners. As Colchester had achieved a non-League double, winning both trophies, they faced the second placed side from the previous campaign, Wycombe. McDonough sent a weakened side out for the match, again in favour of league football, as the U's lost 3–0 to their previous bitter rivals.

Season overview
In the first season since the advent of the Premier League, Colchester's promotion back to the Football League meant that instead of joining the Fourth Division, they instead joined Division Three, the fourth tier of English football but no longer in name.

Chairman James Bowdidge stepped down from his role due to business commitments, and former reserve team player Gordon Parker took over.

Two major player departures occurred across the summer period, with ever-present goalkeeper Scott Barrett opting to join Gillingham on a free transfer, and Forward Mike Masters, who was unable to obtain a work permit.

Colchester lost four of their first five games and found themselves at the bottom of the league table. They also received a heavy fine from The Football Association for indiscipline, with manager Roy McDonough one of the main culprits. The U's attacking nature was not as effected against Football League opposition as it was against their Conference counterparts the previous season. They conceded seven goals and five goals on one occasion each, and also conceded four goals on six separate occasions. Despite this, they rallied late in the season to finish tenth in Division Three, just four points off the play-off positions.

In the FA Cup, Colchester defeated Slough Town by scoring four goals for the third consecutive meeting between the sides. They faced Gillingham at Priestfield Stadium in the second round, but were defeated in the Layer Road replay after a 1–1 draw.

Colchester were narrowly defeated in the first round of the League Cup, with Brighton & Hove Albion coming out on top 2–1 over two legs.

In the first round group stage of the Football League Trophy, the U's were beaten in both of their matches against Northampton Town and Barnet.

The club were also required to play in the Conference Shield, an annual match played between the victors of the FA Trophy and the Conference champions. As Colchester had sealed a non-League double in 1991–92, they faced Wycombe Wanderers who had finished as runners-up to the U's in the league. McDonough sent out a scratch side for the game and Wycombe duly won 3–0.

Players

Transfers

In

 Total spending:  ~ £0

Out

 Total incoming:  ~ £0

Loans in

Match details

Third Division

Results round by round

League table

Matches

League Cup

Conference Shield

FA Cup

Football League Trophy

Squad statistics

Appearances and goals

|-
!colspan="16"|Players who appeared for Colchester who left during the season

|}

Goalscorers

Disciplinary record

Clean sheets
Number of games goalkeepers kept a clean sheet.

Player debuts
Players making their first-team Colchester United debut in a fully competitive match.

See also
List of Colchester United F.C. seasons

References

General
Books

Websites

Specific

1992-93
English football clubs 1992–93 season
1992–93 Football League Third Division by team